South Dakota Highway 36 (SD 36) is an east–west state route located in southwest South Dakota. It begins at the junction of U.S. Route 16A on the eastern edge of Custer State Park, and ends at South Dakota Highway 79 just south of Hermosa.

Route description
South Dakota Highway 36 begins at a junction with SD 79 approximately one mile south of Hermosa. From there, it travels southwest along a winding mountainous road for about   before terminating in Custer State Park at a junction with US 16A.

History
South Dakota 36 was implemented in 1926.  At that time, it continued further west to the Wyoming border, utilizing the current route of US 16A to Custer, and U.S. Route 16 west of Custer; US 16 went northwest from Rapid City.  The western terminus was pulled back to its present location around 1935, when US 16 was rerouted southwest through the Black Hills.

In 1933 and 1934, this route was also part of U.S. Route 216, which then continued north to Rapid City.

Major intersections

References

External links

South Dakota Highways Page: Highways 31-60

036
Transportation in Custer County, South Dakota